Scandium acetate is an inorganic compound, with the chemical formula of Sc(CH3COO)3. It exists in the anhydrous and the hydrate forms. It can be obtained by reacting scandium hydroxide with aqueous acetic acid. It is a water-soluble crystal that decomposes into scandium oxide at high temperature. It can be used to prepare other scandium-containing materials.

References 

Scandium compounds
Acetates